The 2019–20 San Diego 1904 FC season was the club's first ever and its first in the newly created National Independent Soccer Association (NISA), a newly established third division soccer league in the United States.

Overview
1904 FC previously attempted to play professionally in both the North American Soccer League and United Soccer League with neither effort coming to fruition. In mid 2018, the team was announced as the first member of the newly established National Independent Soccer Association.

The team announced Alex Gontran as the club's first head coach on August 28, 2019. The team's first game against the Los Angeles Force was played on September 7, 2019 and was for the "NISA Challenge Cup," a trophy contested between neighboring clubs that moves around the league every season. 1904 lost, 0–2, on the road at Rio Hondo Stadium.

1904 played its first home game at SDCCU Stadium on September 14 against California United Strikers FC. In front of a crowd of nearly 3,000, the team won its first league game, 3–1, with a pair of goals by Lorenzo Ramirez Jr. and a third from Billy Garton via a penalty kick. A second win at home the following week over Oakland Roots SC, 4–3, was the last time the team earned points during the fall as it went on to lose its next three games, finished in third place within the conference, and missed the West Coast playoffs.

On April 27, 2020, following a stoppage of play and subsequent extension due to the COVID-19 pandemic, NISA announced the cancellation of the 2020 Spring season.

Roster

Players

Staff
  Alexandre Gontran – Head coach
  Haruna Ba – Physical Trainer
  Johann Kennel – Performance Trainer

Transfers

Fall

In:

Out:

Spring

In:

Out:

Friendlies

Competitions

NISA Fall season (Showcase) 

Details for the 2019 NISA Fall season were announced July 25, 2019.

Standings

Results summary

Matches

NISA Spring Season 

Details for the 2020 NISA Spring season were announced January 27, 2020.

Standings

Results summary

Matches

U.S. Open Cup 

1904 FC will enter the 2020 U.S. Open Cup with the rest of the National Independent Soccer Association teams in the Second Round. It was announced on 29 January that their first opponent would be either National Premier Soccer League side ASC San Diego or local qualifier Chula Vista FC.

Squad statistics

Appearances and goals 

|-
! colspan="16" style="background:#dcdcdc; text-align:center"| Goalkeepers

|-
! colspan="16" style="background:#dcdcdc; text-align:center"| Defenders

|-
! colspan="16" style="background:#dcdcdc; text-align:center"| Midfielders

|-
! colspan="16" style="background:#dcdcdc; text-align:center"| Forwards

|-
! colspan="16" style="background:#dcdcdc; text-align:center"| Left during season

|-
|}

Goal scorers

Disciplinary record

References

External links 

 

San Diego 1904
San Diego 1904
San Diego 1904
San Diego 1904